WTON may refer to:

 WTON (AM), a radio station (1240 AM) licensed to Staunton, Virginia, United States
 WTON-FM, a radio station (94.3 FM) licensed to Staunton, Virginia, United States